"Painkiller" is a song recorded by Australian singer-songwriter Ruel. The song was released on 1 May 2019 as the lead single from his second extended play, Free Time. The song sees Ruel reunite with producer M-Phazes and Sarah Aarons (whom he had both collaborated with on his 2017 EP Ready), and collaborate with songwriter Hiren Mor for the first time.

In May 2020, a remix featuring American rapper Denzel Curry was released, alongside the announcement of a forthcoming remix EP. The Painkiller remix EP was released on 12 June 2020.

The song placed third at the 2020 Vanda & Young Global Songwriting Competition.

Music video
The music video for "Painkiller" was released on 1 May 2019.

Critical reception
Sose Fuamoli from Triple J said the song is "marked by bold bass and melodic work", saying "'Painkiller' is a track that sees Ruel step into a more mature songwriting space, leaning more into rich R&B notes and letting his natural cadence and rhythmic notes flourish. His soul and jazz influences bleed through on this single too, finding and connecting with that bass groove with ease."

Alissa Arunarsirakul from Ones to Watch said "'Painkiller' is drenched with warm violins, groovy bass lines, and luscious vocals".

Track listing

Charts

Weekly charts

Year-end charts

Certifications

Release history

References
 

2019 singles
Ruel (singer) songs
RCA Records singles
Songs written by Sarah Aarons
Songs written by Ruel (singer)
2019 songs